Antolín Alcaraz Viveros (born 30 July 1982) is a Paraguayan professional footballer who plays for Club Olimpia as a centre-back.

He rarely settled with a team in his early career, before signing in 2003 with Beira-Mar and remaining with the club five seasons, after which he joined Club Brugge. He then spent five years in the Premier League, in service of Wigan Athletic and Everton; after one year in Spain with Las Palmas, he returned to his country.

Alcaraz represented Paraguay at the 2010 World Cup and the 2011 Copa América, helping them to the final of the later tournament.

Club career

Early years and Beira-Mar
Hailing from a humble background, Alcaraz worked throughout his teenage years as a builder's assistant in his hometown of San Roque González de Santa Cruz in the Paraguarí Department. He started his career at Club Teniente Fariña in the city of Ñemby, but he did not have the intention of one day playing professional football.

Whilst Alcaraz was working as a builder at the age of 18, he met scout and football agent Carlos Bruni who took him to Argentina's Racing Club de Avellaneda. He appeared rarely during his spell.

Alcaraz was loaned to ACF Fiorentina in 2002, but the Italians soon faced bankruptcy and regrouped in the Lega Pro Seconda Divisione. He then had a trial at U.S. Città di Palermo, but nothing came of it.

In January 2003, Alcaraz signed for Portuguese club S.C. Beira-Mar. After seven appearances in half a season, he became a defensive mainstay at the Aveiro side. In 2005–06 he helped them return to the Primeira Liga, playing 31 matches.

Brugge
Alcaraz joined Club Brugge KV in Belgium on 30 April 2007, with the deal being effective as of July.

After a slow first season he also eventually became first choice, helping his team to two third-places and one second.

Wigan Athletic

On 14 May 2010, Alcaraz signed with Wigan Athletic on a free transfer for an undisclosed fee, as his contract with Brugge was due to expire at the end of June; his new manager, Roberto Martínez, stated that the player was in "the best form of his career" at that point. He scored his first goal for the club against Sunderland on 11 September 2010, netting in the 86th minute for a 1–1 home draw.

Alcaraz caused widespread controversy on 6 November 2011, when replays showed him spitting at Wolverhampton Wanderers defender Richard Stearman during a 3–1 defeat at Molineux Stadium. He was handed a three-game suspension due to his actions, but later issued an apology.

On 7 May 2012, Alcaraz scored the game's only goal at Blackburn Rovers to retain the Latics' top-division safety, whilst relegating their opponent to the Football League Championship. He won the 2013 FA Cup, featuring the full 90 minutes in the 1–0 upset of Manchester City. However, only three days later, with him on the pitch again, Wigan were relegated from the top division following a 1–4 away loss to Arsenal.

Everton

On 9 July 2013, after becoming a free agent, Alcaraz moved to Everton on a two-year deal as both he and goalkeeper Joel Robles followed coach Martínez to the club. He made his competitive debut on 29 December after an injury struck his start to the season, featuring the full 90 minutes in a 2–1 home win over Southampton.

On 26 April 2014, Alcaraz scored an own goal in the first minute of a 0–2 loss to Southampton. On 1 January of the following year, he received his first sending off as an Everton player, being shown two yellow cards in a 0–2 away defeat against Hull City which was the team's fourth successive of the festive period.

On 10 June 2015, Alcaraz was released.

Las Palmas
On 2 August 2015, aged nearly 33, Alcaraz signed a one-year contract with newly promoted La Liga side UD Las Palmas with the option of a second one. He scored his first goal on 23 September, helping best Sevilla FC 2–0 at home.

During his spell at the Estadio Gran Canaria, Alcaraz made only seven competitive appearances due to injury. On 29 January 2016, he left by mutual consent.

Return home
In February 2016, Alcaraz agreed to a deal at Club Libertad. He made his Paraguayan Primera División debut the following month at the age of 33, in a 2–1 home victory against Cerro Porteño.

On 2 January 2019, Alcaraz signed with Club Olimpia of the same league. In his debut campaign, he was part of the squad that won the national championship.

International career
In November 2008, Alcaraz received his first call-up to the Paraguay national team at the age of 26. He was picked for the squad present at the 2010 FIFA World Cup; on 14 June, in the group stage opener against Italy, in just his seventh cap, he headed home through a powerful header following a set piece in an eventual 1–1 draw in Cape Town, and went on to play all the matches (save one due to suspension) and minutes for the quarter-finalists.

Alcaraz was again first choice for Paraguay during the 2011 Copa América, held in Argentina. On 13 July, he scored the 1–1 equaliser against Venezuela in an eventual 3–3 group stage draw. Four days later, in the quarter-finals with Brazil, he was sent off after an altercation with Lucas Leiva, and the national side finished runners-up.

Career statistics

Club

Scores and results list Paraguay's goal tally first, score column indicates score after each Alcaraz goal.

Honours

Club
Beira-Mar
Segunda Liga: 2005–06

Wigan Athletic
FA Cup: 2012–13

Libertad
Paraguayan Primera División: 2016 Apertura, 2017 Apertura

Olimpia
Paraguayan Primera División: 2019

International
Paraguay
Copa América runner-up: 2011

References

External links

1982 births
Living people
Paraguayan footballers
Association football defenders
Paraguayan Primera División players
Club Libertad footballers
Club Olimpia footballers
Racing Club de Avellaneda footballers
ACF Fiorentina players
Primeira Liga players
Liga Portugal 2 players
S.C. Beira-Mar players
Belgian Pro League players
Club Brugge KV players
Premier League players
Wigan Athletic F.C. players
Everton F.C. players
La Liga players
UD Las Palmas players
Paraguay international footballers
2010 FIFA World Cup players
2011 Copa América players
Paraguayan expatriate footballers
Expatriate footballers in Argentina
Expatriate footballers in Italy
Expatriate footballers in Portugal
Expatriate footballers in Belgium
Expatriate footballers in England
Expatriate footballers in Spain
Paraguayan expatriate sportspeople in Argentina
Paraguayan expatriate sportspeople in Italy
Paraguayan expatriate sportspeople in Portugal
Paraguayan expatriate sportspeople in England
Paraguayan expatriate sportspeople in Spain
FA Cup Final players
Paraguayan people of Italian descent